Aeroportos do Paraná is the department of airports infrastructure of the state of Paraná in Brazil. Aeroportos do Paraná was originally part of the Secretaria de Estado de Transportes do Estado do Paraná, but state law 16,841/2011 created the Secretaria de Infraestrutura e Logística, which became then responsible for the operational support of 35 public airports within the state, in partnership with the Municipalities where they are located, and in accordance to directives from the National Civil Aviation Agency of Brazil (ANAC).

List of airports supported by SEIL
The following airports are operated directly or indirectly by their local municipalities with the support of Aeroportos do Paraná – SEIL:

Andirá
Apucarana – Capt. João Busse Airport
Arapongas – Alberto Bertelli Airport
Arapoti – Avelino Vieira Airport
Bandeirantes
Campo Mourão – Cel. Geraldo Guias de Aquino Airport
Cascavel – Adalberto Mendes da Silva Airport
Castro
Centenário do Sul
Cianorte – Gastão de Mesquita Filho Airport
Cornélio Procópio – Francisco Lacerda Junior Airport
Francisco Beltrão – Paulo Abdala Airport
Goioerê
Guaíra – Walter Martins de Oliveira Airport
Guarapuava – Tancredo Thomas de Farias Airport
Guaratuba
Ibaiti
Loanda
Manoel Ribas
Marechal Cândido Rondon
Maringá – Sílvio Name Júnior Regional Airport
Medianeira
Palmas
Palotina
Paranaguá – Santos Dumont Airport
Paranavaí – Edu Chaves Airport
Pato Branco – Juvenal Loureiro Cardoso Airport
Ponta Grossa – Comte. Antonio Amilton Beraldo Airport
Realeza
Sertanópolis
Siqueira Campos
Telêmaco Borba – Telêmaco Borba Airport
Toledo – Luiz dal Canalle Filho Airport
União da Vitória – José Cleto Airport

Top 5
In 2011 those were the top 5 airports according to number of transported passengers and number of aircraft operations:

Number of transported passengers
1 - Maringá – Sílvio Name Júnior Regional Airport – 677,264
2 - Cascavel – Adalberto Mendes da Silva Airport  – 50,651
3 - Umuarama – Orlando de Carvalho Airport – 4,691
4 - Pato Branco – Juvenal Loureiro Cardoso Airport – 3,087
5 - Telêmaco Borba – Telêmaco Borba Airport – 2,718

Number of aircraft operations
1 - Maringá – Sílvio Name Júnior Regional Airport – 16,726
2 - Cascavel – Adalberto Mendes da Silva Airport – 5,430
3 - Ponta Grossa – Comte. Antonio Amilton Beraldo Airport – 3,657
4 - Umuarama – Orlando de Carvalho Airport – 3,011
5 - Guarapuava – Tancredo Thomas de Farias Airport – 2,805

See also
List of airports in Brazil
List of the busiest airports in Brazil

References

Airports in Paraná (state)
Airport operators